Deborah Lifchitz was a French Jewish expert on Semitic languages of Ethiopia, who worked at the Musée de l'Homme in Paris and took part in the Mission Dakar Djibouti in 1932-3. The Nazis imprisoned her in 1942; she was murdered in Auschwitz.

Deborah (Desirée) Lifchitz (at times spelled Lifschitz, Lifszyc or Livchitz) was born in Kharkiv, Russia in 1907. In 1919, following the October Revolution, her family left Kharkiv, first to Crimea and from there in 1920 to Warsaw. In 1927 Deborah left Poland for Paris, where she studied Oriental languages and specialized in the Semitic languages of Ethiopia. Upon her graduation she joined the Mission Dakar Djibouti to Africa. There she met with the Beta Israel (Jews of Ethiopia). After her return to Paris, Deborah received a position at the Africa department of the Musée de l'Homme in Paris and in 1935 she was member of Mission du Musée d'Ethnographie du Trocadero to French Sudan (Mali). From Mali she brought back two museum pieces of Dogon art currently displayed in the Louvre and the Quai Branly museums. 
Deborah Lifchitz wrote one book and several articles, which are still considered milestones in the research of Ethiopian languages. 
She received her French nationality in 1937. When the Nazis entered Paris, Deborah stayed in the city, and after losing her jobs because of the racial laws she was taken in by her colleague Michel Leiris. In February 1942 she was arrested by the French police, taken to French concentration camp, and from there to Auschwitz where she was murdered later that year. According to the testimony of Marcel Cohen she was gassed.  
During her studies and work at the Musée de l'Homme, Deborah Lifchitz studied and collaborated with the greatest anthropologists and Africanists in Paris of the day, among them Michel Leiris, Wolf Leslau, Marcel Griaule, Marcel Mauss, Marcel Cohen, Paul Boyer, Paul Rivet, Georges Dumézil, Denise Paulme, with whom she wrote many articles, and more.

References 
 Marianne Lemaire, Celles qui passent sans se rallier : la mission Paulme-Lifchitz, janvier-octobre 1935. Paris : LAHIC / DPRPS-Direction des patrimoines, 2014. Les Carnets de Bérose, 5. Édition électronique consultable par le lien :  http://www.berose.fr/spip.php?article595

External links 
 Biography of Deborah Lifchitz on Encyclopedia Aethiopica, pages 567-8.

1907 births
1942 deaths
Writers from Warsaw
People from Kharkov Governorate
Linguists from France
Women linguists
Jewish women writers
Semiticists
White Russian emigrants to France
French civilians killed in World War II
French people who died in Auschwitz concentration camp
20th-century French women writers
French Jews who died in the Holocaust
20th-century linguists
Jewish linguists